The National Performing Arts Competition, commonly abbreviated Sokayeti, is an annual performing arts competition held in Myanmar since 1993. The competition is held in October of each year.

Divisions 
The Sokayeti is divided into divisions, namely singing, dancing, composing, and instrumental performances, theatrical performances, marionette. and Burmese drama. Dances from ethnic minorities, including the Karen don dance have been included into the competition. Most competitors are from the National University of Arts and Culture, Yangon and Mandalay, the State School of Fine Arts, and other culture-oriented educational institutions.

The divisions are divided into gender, and include:

 Singing 
 Mahāgīta
 Old and contemporary songs
 Popular songs
 Dancing
 Dance
 Dramatic play - Suvaṇṇa Jātaka (သုဝဏ္ဏဇာတ်တော်ကြီ)
 Marionette
 Yokson (person, parrot, nat, mouse)
 Yokthe (prince, princess, ogre)
 Kwetseit (ကွက်စိပ်)
 Sutanu Jātaka (သုတနုဇာတ်)
 Scene of Rāhula Requesting Inheritance
 မွေခံထိုက်စေရိုးရာအမွေ
 Composing
 Amateur Level 1
 Amateur Level 2
 Professional
 Instrumental performances
 Burmese harp
 Pattala
 Piano
 Hsaing waing
 Hne
 Violin
 Hsaingwainggyi
 Ozi (အိုးစည်)
 Dobat (ဒိုးပတ်)
 Mandolin
 Guitar
 Donmin (ဒုံမင်း)

Levels 
Competitors in each division are divided into 6 levels, according to age and ability: 

 Amateur Level 1
 Amateur Level 2
 Professional
 Ages 15 to 20
 Ages 10 to 15
 Ages 5 to 10

References

See also 

 Burmese music
 Burmese dance
 Culture of Myanmar
 Mahagita

Burmese music
Music competitions
Dance competitions
Performing arts contests